Adriana Torrebejano Giménez (3 November 1991) is a Spanish actress.

She played Sandra with Ana Obregón in the Antena 3 TV series Ellas y el sexo débil. From 2010 to 2013 she played Isabel Lobo in the Telecinco TV series Tierra de lobos. In 2012 she appeared in the TV miniseries El Rey in the role of the Countess Olghina di Robilant. In 2015 she played Sol in El secreto de Puente Viejo.

Filmography

Films
 Mañana y siempre (2018)
 Gun City (2018) as Lola
 Luz azul (2018) as Voz Luz Azul
 La madriguera (2016) as Caterina
 Tarde (2012) as Ella
 La noche rota (2011) as Chica bus

TV

References

External links

 

1991 births
Actresses from Barcelona
Television actresses from Catalonia
Living people
21st-century Spanish actresses